James L. Schoppe is an American production designer and art director. He was nominated for an Academy Award in the category Best Art Direction for the film Return of the Jedi.

Selected filmography
 Return of the Jedi (1983)

References

External links

American production designers
American art directors
Year of birth missing (living people)
Living people